RCS Sport is a sport and media company that operates mainly in Italy in the sports sector, as part of RCS MediaGroup. It organises some of Italy's biggest road cycling events, including the Giro d'Italia, Milan–San Remo and Tirreno–Adriatico, as well as non-cycling events such as the Milan Marathon. RCS Sport was started in 1989 as an independent company from La Gazzetta dello Sport while continuing to be its "organizational arm". It also offers consultancy and partnership for other sports organisers, helping with events like Lega Basket Serie A and The Color Run.

Cycling 

RCS Sport owns 5 Cycling UCI World Tour events: 
 Giro d'Italia
 Milan–San Remo
 Il Lombardia
 Tirreno–Adriatico
 Strade Bianche
The also own four UCI Europe Tour events:
 Roma Maxima
 Milano–Torino
 Giro del Piemonte
 Giro di Sicilia
And 2 UCI Asia Tour events:
 UAE Tour
 Abu Dhabi Tour (former race, as it was merged with Dubai Tour Shorts into UAE Tour, last held 2018)
 Dubai Tour (former race, as it was merged with Dubai Tour into UAE Tour, last held 2018)

Soccer 

RCS Sport is a commercial advisor of the Italian Football Federation and Series B soccer league.

Mass events 

RCS Sport organises the IAAF Milano City Marathon, the Fisherman’s Friend StrongmanRun in Italy, The Color Run and the Gran Fondo Giro d'Italia.

Basketball 

RCS Sport is commercial advisor of the Italian Basketball Federation (Italy national basketball team) and organises the main events of A Series Basketball League (Final8, All Star Game and Supercoppa Italiana).
In 2012 RCS Sport have partnered with NBA to organize the Italian stage of the NBA Europe Live Tour.

Training 

Since 2010, RCS Sport with SDA Bocconi School of Management has developed "Sports Business Academy", a centre of sports management and a place for meeting and networking.

External links 
 Sito ufficiale RCS Sport

Sports management companies
Sports event promotion companies